Stein-Säckingen railway station is a railway station in the municipality of Stein, in the Swiss canton of Aargau. It is an intermediate stop on the Bözberg line and western terminus of the Koblenz–Stein-Säckingen line. It is served by local and regional trains.

Services

Regional
The following regional trains call at Stein-Säckingen:

InterRegio: half-hourly service over the Bözberg line from Basel SBB to Zürich Hauptbahnhof, with every other train continuing to Zürich Airport.

Local
Stein-Säckingen is served by the S1 the Basel S-Bahn:

: half-hourly service from Basel SBB over the Bözberg line to Frick or over the Koblenz–Stein-Säckingen railway line to Laufenburg.

References

External links

Railway stations in the canton of Aargau
Swiss Federal Railways stations